Hahnenfurth/Düssel station is located in the district of Dornap, Wuppertal, in the German state of North Rhine-Westphalia. The station was opened on a new section of line connecting  and the Wuppertal-Vohwinkel–Essen-Überruhr railway on 13 December 2020. There was formerly a nearby station called Dornap-Hahnenfurth on the Düsseldorf-Derendorf–Dortmund Süd railway, which was opened by the Rhenish Railway Company on 15 September 1879 and closed on 23 August 1991.

The station is served by line S 28 of the Rhine-Ruhr S-Bahn, running between Wuppertal Hauptbahnhof and Kaarster See, operating every 20 or 40 minutes, alternatively, during the day.

References

Rhine-Ruhr S-Bahn stations
S28 (Rhine-Ruhr S-Bahn)
Railway stations in Germany opened in 2020
Railway stations in Wuppertal